Sarah or Sara Bates may refer to:

Sarah Bates (Mormon) (1817–1888), American Mormon pioneer
Sarah Bates (Shaker) (1792–1881), American Shaker artist
Sarah Bates (singer) (1758–1811), English singer
Sara Bates (born 1944), American Cherokee artist